Velu Prabakaran is an Indian filmmaker, cinematographer and actor. He is known for his themes highlighting atheism and revolutionary subjects in his films.

Career
Velu Prabakaran began as a cinematographer before making his directorial debut with the 1989 horror film Nalaya Manithan, before also directing its sequel Adhisaya Manithan (1990). He then made two more consecutive action films under R. K. Selvamani's production in Asuran and Rajali, with both becoming box office failures.  He then worked on action films with lead characters, who often featured as a revolutionary, making Kadavul (1997), Sivan (1999) and Puratchikkaaran (2000). In 2000, he began pre-production on a film titled Deepavali and approached Kamal Haasan to play the lead role. However, the actor's rejection meant that the project was later shelved.

Velu Prabakaran began work on the production of a film titled Kadhal Arangam in 2004, writing the story, screenplay and dialogue for the project.  Starring newcomers Preethi Rangayani and Shirley Das in leading roles, he revealed that the film would expose the falsehood of kama in society, though he later gave directorial credits of the film to his brother Velu Raja. The film also takes on the prevailing caste system and explores sexuality. Thus, the censors were not willing to give it a certificate due to objectionable scenes and an ongoing battle with the censor board emerged in December 2004.  In December 2006, Velu Prabakaran held an emotional appeal at a press conference stating that the film touched upon issues of social concern and stressed the importance of sex education amongst youngsters.  In 2009, the team finally agreed to tone down the scenes and mute certain dialogues and to compromise with the censors the film, they changed the title from Kadhal Arangam to Kadhal Kathai.  In the title credits of the film, Velu Prabakaran included an extended scene which narrates his opinions and difficulties of the way the film released; while he also plays the role of a film director in the venture, noting that parts were autobiographical.  The film opened to very negative reviews from critics, with a reviewer noting "the movie has apparently no script or whatever and is a string of events interspersed with sex scenes."  Another critic noted "it's too boring to even qualify as a sex flick", describing the film as "unwatchable".

In 2009, he signed on to direct a film titled Devadasi under JSK Film Corporation telling the tale of a 16th-century romance, though delays meant that he began another project titled Mugamoodi Koothu and then another titled Kalainganin Kadhal, where he would play the lead role. The projects failed to take off and since then the director has kept away from the film industry for a number of years, before releasing a teaser trailer to Oru Iyakkunarin Kadhal Diary during January 2017.

Personal life
Velu Prabhakaran was previously married to actress and director P. Jayadevi. At the age of 60 in June 2017, Velu Prabakaran announced to marry Shirley Das who acted in his film Kadhal Kadhai (2009).

Filmography

References

External links
 

Tamil film directors
Living people
Male actors from Chennai
Tamil male actors
Film directors from Chennai
Cinematographers from Tamil Nadu
Tamil film cinematographers
Male actors in Tamil cinema
Tamil Nadu State Film Awards winners
Screenwriters from Tamil Nadu
Tamil screenwriters
20th-century Indian film directors
21st-century Indian film directors
20th-century Indian male actors
21st-century Indian male actors
1957 births
Periyarists